Montpellier–Méditerranée Airport or Aéroport de Montpellier–Méditerranée , also known as Fréjorgues Airport, is an airport in southern France. The airport opened in 1946, 8 years after the first flight to the area.

The airport carries the 10th largest number of passengers in France (over 1.18 million in 2010). A campus of the École nationale de l'aviation civile (French civil aviation university) is also located at the airport.

Facilities

Airlines and destinations
The following airlines operate regular scheduled and charter flights at Montpellier–Méditerranée Airport:

Statistics

Ground transport
Bus route 120 (the "Airport Shuttle") runs between Place de l’Europe tramway station and the Airport along Avenue Pierre Mendès-France.
ÉcoPôle and Parc Expo are the closest Montpellier tramway stations, but the stations are not close to the passenger terminal.

Airlife magazine
Montpellier Airport's  quarterly magazine, Airlife, began publication in 2016. Published by Lysagora Media, the magazine has articles on travel, design, lifestyle and leisure as well as information about the airport and its flight schedules.

References

External links

 Montpellier Airport (official site) 
 CCI de Montpellier (official site) 
 Aéroport de Montpellier–Méditerranée (Union des Aéroports Français) 
 
 
 

Airports in Occitania (administrative region)
Buildings and structures in Montpellier
Buildings and structures in Hérault
Airports established in 1946